Cecil Smith was the 1st Accountant and Auditor General of Sri Lanka. He was appointed on 24 January 1799, and held the office until September 1799. He was succeeded by Thomas Frazer.

References

Auditors General of Sri Lanka
British colonial governors and administrators in Asia
Year of birth missing
Year of death missing